Shakur Brown (born April 1, 1999) is an American football cornerback for the Arlington Renegades of the XFL. He played college football for the Michigan State Spartans.

Early life and high school
Brown grew up in Detroit, Michigan and his family decided to move to Georgia when he was 14 and he attended Woodland High School. Brown was rated a three-star recruit and committed to play college football at West Virginia over offers from Kentucky, Minnesota, Ole Miss, South Carolina and Tennessee but did not qualify academically initially. After being cleared by the NCAA, Brown committed to play at Michigan State.

College career
Brown redshirted his true freshman season. As a redshirt freshman, he played in 12 of the Spartans' games as a reserve and intercepted a pass, which he returned 69 yards for a touchdown. Brown missed the first six games of his redshirt sophomore season due to injury. He finished his redshirt junior season with five interceptions and four passes broken up. Following the end of the season, Brown declared that he would be entering the 2021 NFL Draft.

Professional career

Pittsburgh Steelers
Brown signed with the Pittsburgh Steelers as an undrafted free agent on May 7, 2021. He was waived on August 28, 2021.

Kansas City Chiefs
On September 3, 2021, Brown was signed to the Kansas City Chiefs practice squad. He was released on September 11.

Detroit Lions
On October 15, 2021, Brown was signed to the Detroit Lions practice squad. He was released on October 30. He was re-signed on December 14. He was released on December 21.

Pittsburgh Maulers
Brown signed with the Pittsburgh Maulers of the United States Football League on April 22, 2022.

Tennessee Titans
On July 29, 2022, Brown signed with the Tennessee Titans. He was waived on August 22, 2022.

Arlington Renegades 
On November 17, 2022, Brown was drafted by the Arlington Renegades of the XFL.

References

External links
Michigan State Spartans bio

1999 births
Living people
People from Stockbridge, Georgia
Players of American football from Georgia (U.S. state)
Sportspeople from the Atlanta metropolitan area
American football cornerbacks
Michigan State Spartans football players
Pittsburgh Steelers players
Kansas City Chiefs players
Detroit Lions players
Pittsburgh Maulers (2022) players
Tennessee Titans players
Arlington Renegades players